Misfits is a British science fiction comedy-drama television show, on the network Channel 4, about a group of young offenders sentenced to work in a community service programme, where they obtain supernatural powers after a strange electrical storm. The show premiered on 12 November 2009 and concluded on 11 December 2013 after its fifth series.

Series overview

Episodes

Series 1 (2009)

Series 2 (2010) 
The events of Series 2 commence immediately after the end of Series 1. Filming took place in May 2010 and the second series began airing in November 2010.

Series 3 (2011)
The third series of Misfits began airing on 30 October 2011 with the first of eight episodes. Robert Sheehan, who played Nathan in the first two series of the show, does not appear in the third series. His exit is shown in an online film that was released on the official Misfits website on 15 September, shortly before the third series airs. The online film is set in Las Vegas, Nevada, United States. A new character called Rudy is introduced in the first episode to replace Nathan, played by Joseph Gilgun.

Series 4 (2012)
Misfits was renewed for a fourth season on 16 December 2011. On 20 December 2011, Antonia Thomas announced via Twitter that she will not be returning for the fourth series: 'I won't be coming back for series 4 but I can't wait to see it! I've had an amazing time in Misfits- it has been epic!'. On 20 December 2011, Iwan Rheon also announced through Facebook that he would not be returning for the fourth series.

Series 5 (2013)

References

External links 
 List of Misfits episodes at Channel 4
 

Lists of British comedy-drama television series episodes
Lists of British science fiction television series episodes
Lists of supernatural television series episodes